The Dawn of Shockabilly is an EP by Shockabilly, released in 1982 by Rough Trade Records.

Track listing

Personnel
Adapted from The Dawn of Shockabilly liner notes.

Shockabilly
 Eugene Chadbourne – vocals, electric guitar
 Kramer – organ, tape, production
 David Licht – percussion

Production and additional personnel
 John Jordan – recording
 Michael Macioce – cover art
 George Peckham – mastering
 Shannon Scully – cover art

Release history

References 

1982 debut EPs
Shockabilly albums
Albums produced by Kramer (musician)
Rough Trade Records EPs